The 2015 National Rugby Championship (known as the Buildcorp National Rugby Championship for sponsorship reasons) was the second season of Australia's National Rugby Championship, involving nine professional rugby union teams from around Australia. The competition kicked off 20 August 2015.

The deciding match, played at Ballymore, was won 21–10 by Brisbane to claim their second consecutive NRC title.

Teams

The nine teams confirmed for the 2015 NRC season include four from New South Wales, two from Queensland, and one each from Australian Capital Territory, Victoria, and Western Australia:

Home match venues for the 2015 NRC season:

Television coverage and streaming
One (or more) of the NRC matches each round is broadcast live via Fox Sports, typically the Thursday night match. Streaming of the three non-broadcast matches per round, usually played on Saturday or Sunday, is hosted by Fox Sports online. Discussion of the NRC competition is included on Fox Sports' Rugby HQ program on Thursday nights following the live match broadcast, and on the review show NRC Extra Time on Monday nights.

Experimental Law Variations
The ARU was given approval by World Rugby (then known as the International Rugby Board) to conduct experimental law trials as part of the 2014 National Rugby Championship. These law variations were retained for the 2015 season. Consideration was given to reverting the value of a successful conversion kick to 2 points to restore a converted try to 7 points, but the 3 point conversion variation was retained.

Regular season
The nine teams compete in a round-robin tournament for the regular season. Each team has four matches at home and four away, with one bye. The top four teams qualify for the title play-offs with semi-finals and finals.

During this section of the tournament, teams can also play for the Horan-Little Shield, a challenge trophy that is played for when a challenge is accepted or offered by the holders.

Standings

Competition rounds

Round 1

Round 2

Round 3

Round 4

Round 5

Round 6

Round 7

Round 8

Round 9

Title play-offs
The top four sides in the regular season advanced to the semifinals of the knock-out stage, which was followed by the final to decide the National Rugby Championship title.

Semi-finals

Final

Total season attendances

Players
The leading scorers in 2015 over the regular season and finals combined were:

Leading try scorers 

Source: buildcorpnrc.com.au

Leading point scorers

Source: buildcorpnrc.com.au

Barbarians tour
After the NRC finals, an Australian Barbarians team selected from the NRC played a two-match tour against the New Zealand Heartland XV. NRC players that were not contracted for Super Rugby were eligible for the Barbarians. The series was won 2–0 by the Australian Barbarians.

See also

 Australian Rugby Championship (predecessor tournament)
 Super Rugby

Notes
 There were six late replacements made to the Barbarians squad with some players originally selected being unavailable to tour.

References

External links

NRC on Fox Sports

Team webpages

2015 National Rugby Championship
2015 in Australian rugby union
2015 rugby union tournaments for clubs